Log nad Škofjo Loko is a village on the right bank of the Poljanščica River in the Municipality of Škofja Loka in the Upper Carniola region of Slovenia.

Name
The name of the settlement was changed from Log to Log nad Škofjo Loko in 1955.

References

External links

Log nad Škofjo Loko at Geopedia

Populated places in the Municipality of Škofja Loka